A list of all windmills and windmill sites which lie in the current ceremonial county of Cambridgeshire.


Locations

A - B

C - D

E

F - G

H - I

K - L

M - O

P - R

S

T

U - Y

Locations formerly within Cambridgeshire
For mills in Upwell see List of windmills in Norfolk.

Maps
1610 - Map of Huntingdonshire, 1610, John Speed
1797 - William Faden
1826 - Andrew Bryant
1885 - Ordnance Survey 25 inch England and Wales

Notes

Mills in bold are still standing, known building dates are indicated in bold. Text in italics denotes indicates that the information is not confirmed, but is likely to be the case stated.

Sources

Unless otherwise stated, the source for all entries is

References

 
Cambridgeshire
Windmills